WAMC is a public radio network headquartered in Albany, New York. The network has 12 broadcast radio stations (transmitters) and 16 broadcast relay stations (translators, repeaters). The two flagship stations in the WAMC network are WAMC-FM 90.3 MHz and its simulcast AM station WAMC AM 1400 in Albany. The organization's legal name is "WAMC" and it is also known as "WAMC Northeast Public Radio".

WAMC is a member of NPR and network affiliate of Public Radio Exchange and American Public Media. Unlike many NPR stations around the U.S. which use mostly outside programming, much of WAMC's schedule is produced in-house. WAMC is a charitable, educational, non-commercial broadcaster meeting the requirements of Section 501(c)(3) of the Internal Revenue Code (26 U.S.C. §501(c)(3)) It had total annual revenues for the fiscal year 2010 of $6.36 million.

The station operates The Linda/WAMC Performing Arts Studio, a performance venue in Albany located near its Central Avenue studios.  The station's corporate officers include Anne Erickson, chair of the board of trustees, and Alan S. Chartock, president and chief executive officer (since 1981).

History

Albany Medical Center
Albert P. Fredette served as the first general manager. WAMC was put on the air by the local hospital and medical school, Albany Medical Center and Albany Medical College. Albany Medical Center is a large tertiary-care hospital serving the upper Hudson Valley, and the medical school is one of the country's ACGME-accredited medical schools. The affiliation with Albany Medical College was the source of the call sign WAMC. In 1981, the station became an independent institution, no longer associated with the medical school.

In its early days, WAMC had a mostly classical music radio format. The earliest years also included broadcasts of health information and lectures from visiting medical professors. Early on, part of WAMC's regular programming was the broadcast of live concerts by the Boston Symphony Orchestra from Tanglewood and Boston.  When the NPR network was founded in 1970, WAMC signed on as one of NPR's original 90 "charter" members.

Separating from the medical school
Around 1980, financial pressures caused the hospital and medical school to begin divesting the station. In 1981, the Federal Communications Commission (FCC) license on 90.3 FM was transferred to a 501c3 tax-exempt entity, WAMC, Inc., which had been set up by a group of five corporators, including the current CEO and president, Alan S. Chartock. WAMC was initially affiliated with the State University of New York and New York State government.

In the years since the transfer, the station has eliminated classical music, except for live BSO concerts. It has become a producer of information-based, non-music programming, providing a variety of interview-format programs to radio stations across the country via the station's in-house subsidiary, National Productions.  (WMHT-FM in nearby Schenectady and its network of repeater stations continues to program classical music in the region.)

Expanding the network
Listener contributions (often obtained during periodic pledge drives) and corporate contributions have helped the original single station grow over the years into a network of 22 facilities with large primary service contours covering the Capital District, the Adirondacks section of New York State, Western Massachusetts, Southern Vermont, and parts of New Hampshire, Connecticut, Pennsylvania and New Jersey.

It has been a custom on WAMC to play two songs to mark the end of every fund drive: Kate Smith's "God Bless America" and Ray Charles' rendition of "America the Beautiful".  The station's February 2017 fund drive raised over $1,000,000 in less than one day.

The main 90.3 mHz signal has an effective radiated power (ERP) of 10,000 watts, which on paper is somewhat modest for a full NPR member on the FM band. However, its height above average terrain (HAAT) of  gives it one of the largest coverage areas of any NPR station in the Northeast. It provides at least grade B coverage to most of east-central New York (including the Capital District), southwestern Vermont, western Massachusetts, southwestern New Hampshire, and northwestern Connecticut.

Mount Greylock
While WAMC-FM is based in Albany, its transmitter is actually in Massachusetts.  WAMC-FM's antenna tower is atop Mount Greylock in Adams, in the Mount Greylock State Reservation.  It is the tallest mountain in Massachusetts.  The transmitter had formerly been a tenant on the tower, which was built and maintained by the Albany ABC-TV affiliate WTEN (channel 10) for its satellite station for the Berkshire region and Pittsfield, WCDC.  WCDC had broadcast on channel 19 but that signal was shut down in 2017. The tower also features a radio facility for the Massachusetts State Police and a translator station for the Albany NBC affiliate, WNYT (channel 13).

On December 22, 2017, WAMC entered into an agreement to purchase the Mount Greylock WCDC transmitter and tower from the owner of WTEN/WCDC, Nexstar Media Group, for just above $1 million. WCDC-TV had gone permanently silent on November 19, 2017, two weeks ahead of a planned December 1 shutdown amid declining over-the-air viewership, following damage to the station's transmission line in a storm. The TV station license was surrendered for cancellation on February 12, 2018, as a result of the FCC's 2016 spectrum auction for $34.5 million in compensation. Due to the tower sitting on Massachusetts Department of Conservation and Recreation land, as well as WTEN's lease on the land having expired two years prior, WAMC-FM could have been taken off the air if it had not purchased the facility. WAMC now owns the tower itself, but not the land beneath, which is under lease with the MDCR until 2025.

Accusations of bias 
NPR's official news policy says its affiliate stations should be "fair, unbiased, accurate, honest, and respectful of the people that are covered".  A Washington-based NPR news producer, who requested anonymity, stated that Chartock, the station's president and a frequently heard voice on the station, presents politically-biased commentary.

Chartock responded that WAMC's editorial neutrality is maintained by "including as many conservative commentators on the air as liberal ones".

First Amendment Fund
In 2005, WAMC's board of trustees established a "First Amendment Fund" to promote and preserve the First Amendment and the right of free speech by providing a source of funding "to support WAMC if special situations or needs should arise". The contributions in this "unrestricted, board designated" fund reported on WAMC's 2006 IRS tax forms was $482,577.

Other stations

Repeaters

Translators

Programs
WAMC syndicates many of its shows to other public radio stations.  These programs include... 
Legislative Gazette
Women's news show 51% with Jesse King
Environmental news show Earth Wise
Person Place Thing with Randy Cohen
The Academic Minute with Lynn Pasquerella
Ideas show The Best Of Our Knowledge with Bob Barrett
Author interview program The Book Show with Joe Donahue
The Capitol Connection with Alan S. Chartock
Media criticism show The Media Project.

See also
 Alan S. Chartock
 David Guistina

References

External links
 
 WAMC Northeast PIRATE Network—a website critical of WAMC and its management
 
 
 
 

Mass media in Berkshire County, Massachusetts
NPR member networks
NPR member stations
AMC
AMQ
AMK